HMS Teviot was a Yarrow type River Class Destroyer ordered by the Royal Navy under the 1902 – 1903 Naval Estimates.  Named after the River Teviot in southern Scotland near the border with England, she was the first ship to carry this name in the Royal Navy. She served during World War 1, primarily on anti-submarine duty in the Channel, and was sold for breaking up in 1919.

Construction
She was laid down on 18 August 1902 at the Yarrow shipyard at Poplar and launched on 7 November 1903.  Her build was completed in April 1904.  Her original armament was to be the same as the Turleback torpedo boat destroyers that preceded her.  In 1906 the Admiralty decided to upgrade the armament by landing the five 6-pounder naval guns and shipping three 12-pounder 8 hundredweight (cwt) guns.  Two would be mounted abeam at the foc'x'le break and the third gun would be mounted on the quarterdeck.

Pre-War
After commissioning she was assigned to the East Coast Destroyer Flotilla of the 1st Fleet and based at Harwich.

On 7 August 1907 Teviot collided with the destroyer , badly damaging Kestrel, which had her bow cut off in the collision.

In April 1909 she was assigned to the 3rd Destroyer Flotilla of the 1st Fleet on its formation at Harwich.  She remained until displaced by a Basilisk Class destroyer by May 1912.  She was assigned to the 5th Destroyer Flotilla in the 2nd Fleet with a nucleus crew.

On 30 August 1912 the Admiralty directed all destroyers were to be grouped into classes designated by letters, with the River-class becoming known officially as the E-Class. The class letters were painted on the hull below the bridge area and on one of the funnels.

World War I
In early 1914 after being displaced by G Class destroyers she was assigned to the 9th Destroyer Flotilla based at Chatham tendered to the depot ship .  The 9th Flotilla was a Patrol Flotilla tasked with anti-submarine and counter mining patrols in the Firth of Forth area.  By September 1914, she was deployed to Portsmouth and the Dover Patrol.  Here she provided anti-submarine, counter mining patrols and defended the Dover Barrage.

In August 1915 with the amalgamation of the 7th and 9th Flotillas, she was assigned to the 1st Destroyer Flotilla when it was redeployed to Portsmouth in November 1916.  She was equipped with depth charges for employment in anti-submarine patrols, escorting of merchant ships and defending the Dover Barrage.  In the spring of 1917 as the convoy system was being introduced the 1st Flotilla was employed in convoy escort duties for the English Channel for the remainder of the war.

Disposition
In 1919 she was paid off and laid up in reserve awaiting disposal.  On 23 June 1919 she was sold to Thos. W. Ward of Sheffield for breaking at Morecombe, Lancashire.

She was not awarded a Battle Honour for her service

Pennant Numbers

References

Bibliography
 
 
 
 
 
 
 

 

River-class destroyers
1903 ships